The Better Than Cash Alliance is a global partnership of 80 governments, companies, and International Organizations that accelerates the transition from cash to responsible digital payments to help achieve the Sustainable Development Goals (SDGs).

History, description and work 

The Better Than Cash Alliance was created in September 2012. Its founding members were the governments of Colombia, Kenya, Peru, and the Philippines, as well as CARE, Concern Worldwide, Mercy Corps, United Nations Development Programme (UNDP) and World Food Programme (WFP). The United Nations Capital Development Fund serves as the secretariat. 

Based at the UN, the Alliance now has 80 members and is an implementing partner for the G20’s Global Partnership for Financial Inclusion (GPFI). The Alliance’s secretariat works closely with member governments, companies and other global organizations. According to its website its members are committed to digitizing payments in order to boost efficiency, transparency, women’s economic participation and financial inclusion, helping build economies that are digital and inclusive. Its website also states that "Members do not want to abolish physical cash, but rather want to provide responsible digital payment options that are “better than cash”".

The Alliance Secretariat works with members on their journey to digitize payments by:

 Providing advisory services based on their priorities.
 Sharing action-oriented research and fostering peer learning on responsible practices.
 Conducting advocacy at national, regional and global level.

The Bill & Melinda Gates Foundation, Citigroup, the Ford Foundation, the Omidyar Network, the United Nations Capital Development Fund, the United States Agency for International Development (USAID),  and Visa Inc. were founding funders of the Alliance. Further current funders include the German Federal Ministry for Economic Cooperation and Development (BMZ), the Mastercard Foundation, the Swedish International Development Cooperation Agency (Sida), and the Swiss State Secretariat for Economic Affairs (SECO).

Members

Why digital payments? 
Around 1.7 billion adults are excluded from the formal financial system, according to the 2017 World Bank Global Findex. Financial exclusion is greatest among poor people and in emerging and developing countries. This hampers people’s ability to earn, protect themselves in times of crisis, and to build for the future. In addition, the International Finance Corporation (IFC) estimates that 65 million firms, or 40% of formal micro, small and medium enterprises (MSMEs) in developing countries, have an unmet financing need of $5.2 trillion every year.

With digitization on the rise, financial inclusion is increasing globally. The 2017 World Bank Global Findex database shows that 1.2 billion adults have obtained an account since 2011, including 515 million since 2014. Between 2014 and 2017, the share of adults who have an account with a financial institution or through a mobile money service rose globally from 62 percent to 69 percent. 

However, still billions of dollars in cash payments are made daily in emerging and developing countries, including salaries, social transfers, humanitarian relief and payments to suppliers and farmers. Shifting these payments from cash to digital has the potential to improve the lives of people on low income, particularly women. It also means that governments, companies and International Organizations can make and receive payments in a cheaper, safer and more transparent way, helping build economies that are inclusive.

For instance, digital financial services have expanded opportunities for millions of women across the globe. More than 240 million more women now have an account with a financial institution or mobile money service, compared to 2014. Inclusive digital financial services refer to mobile money, online accounts, electronic payments, insurance and credit, combinations of them and newer fintech apps, that reach people who were formerly excluded. Digital financial inclusion, when provided responsibly and sustainably in a well-regulated environment, not only drives growth, but also enables faster progress toward many of the SDGs. Here are some examples:

 In Kenya, the spread of mobile money lifted roughly 1 million people out of extreme poverty from 2008 to 2014 – the equivalent of 2% of the population.
 In Sierra Leone, shifting to digital payments at the height of the Ebola crisis from 2014 to 2016 helped critical health workers receive their pay quicker – reducing payment time from over a month to around one week – which eliminated worker strikes and secured the Ebola response workforce that saved countless lives.
 In India, switching from cash to smart cards for pension payments in Andrah Pradesh between 2010 and 2012 was correlated with a 47% fall in reported requests for bribes from officials.
 In India, in a government workfare program reaching over 100 million people, women who received benefits paid digitally into an account led to increased employment compared to those paid in cash. The biggest impact was on women whose husbands had expressed the most opposition to their wives working.
 In Bangladesh, garment factories that digitized their payments to staff and vendors reported a 53% time-savings for their administrative and finance teams.
 In Ghana, by introducing digital payments and prepaid smart meters, Safe Water Network more than doubled its per-liter payment collection rate between 2016 and 2017, helping the company sustainably expand access to safe drinking water.

In 2020, during the COVID-19 crisis many governments around the world accelerated digitization of their payments to get social transfers to their people in need in a way that is faster, more secure, more efficient, and to further enhance financial inclusion efforts. For example, in Colombia, the government created Ingreso solidario, a non-conditional transfer program targeting 3 million vulnerable households not covered by other social programs. Further, the government in Togo launched Novissi, a cash transfer program that disburses social welfare payments through mobile channels. In order to ensure these types of transfers are implemented responsibly, recommendations on managing the risks have been developed by key International Organizations, including the Alliance, with achieving financial equality as one of the main objectives.

References

External links 
 Official website

Banking technology
Cashless society
International economic organizations
Fiscal policy
Global policy organizations
Globalism
World government